Odesa's Philharmonic Theatre is a theater in Odesa, Ukraine. The design resembles the Doge's Palace in Venice.

History
The foundation stone for the theater was laid September 3, 1894, a day after Odesa's one-hundred-year birthday. The building was intended as the new stock exchange, or "New Exchange" to replace the old stock exchange, and the vast hall was decorated with six panels by the artist Nikolay Karazin (1842-1908)  which depict commerce throughout various stages of history.

Like the Odesa Opera Theater before it, a world competition was announced for a conceptual design of a new Odesa stock exchange. The design of Czech architect V.J. Prohaska was considered the best. But this design did not meet all of the requirements, therefore it was modified and improved by Aleksander Osipovich Bernardazzi.

Construction was completed in 1898. Since 1924 the building has housed the Odesa Philharmonic.

Construction
The theater can seat 1,000 people and is 15 meters high and 910 square meters. The large hall has no supporting columns, and because of this, it was one of the most expensive buildings in Odesa to build.

The ceiling of this open entry is painted with the twelve symbols of the Zodiac.

The interior is paneled with dark Lebanese cedar, and the windows are set in white Carrara marble.

Pictures

Odesa Philharmonic Orchestra
The theater serves as home for the Odesa Philharmonic Orchestra, which was founded in 1937. Since 1991, American Hobart Earle has conducted the orchestra.

Interesting Mythology
It is an enduring myth that everyone in the city knows (and continues to promulgate) that since the building was originally designed as a Stock exchange rather than a concert hall it was made to be sound-resistant, rather than sound-conducting, in order to provide more privacy to visitors. Seems the myth created by famous soviet singer Leonid Utyosov. In his memories, Utyosov half joking way describe appearing of exchange building. This supposedly explains why the acoustics are rather poor, as compared with other theaters and concert halls, and performers must use microphones and amplifiers to be heard adequately. The precise and technical reasons for the acoustic problems at the hall were reported by world famous acoustics consultant Russell Johnson, the specifics of which can be found on the Philharmonic's website (https://web.archive.org/web/20180530074859/http://www.odessaphilharmonic.org/pages.php?page=conc)

Quotes

Notes

External links

 20 photos of the theater

Theatres in Odesa
Pushkinska Street, Odesa
Theatres completed in 1898
Brick buildings and structures
Gothic Revival architecture in Ukraine
Moorish Revival architecture in Ukraine